Texas has had chief executives with the titles of governors and presidents since 1691.  These were under the flags of:

 (New) Spain (governors, 1691–1821)
 Mexico (governors, 1821–1836)
 Republic of Texas (presidents, 1836–1846)
United States of America (governors, 1846–1861 and 1865–present)
 Confederate States of America (governors, 1861–1865)

Spanish Texas
From 1691 through 1821, the Kingdom of Texas (El Reino de Texas, in modern Spanish, Tejas) was a part of the Viceroyalty of New Spain (El Virreinato de Nueva España).

Governors of the provinces of Coahuila and Texas 
From 1691 to 1722 Texas and Coahuila had the same government, even though they were different provinces. The official seat of government was in Monclova, Coahuila.

Province of Texas 
From 1722 to 1823 Texas had its own governors. From 1722 to 1768 the seat of government of Texas was in Los Adaes and this was the official capital of the province from 1729 to 1772. In 1768 the seat of government was established in San Antonio, which was the capital of Texas from 1772 to 1823.

Mexican Texas

Province of Texas 
Following the Mexican War of Independence, recognised by the Treaty of Córdoba, the territory of Texas became part of the First Mexican Empire.

State of Coahuila y Texas 
After the dissolution of the first Mexican empire, the Federal Constitution of the United Mexican States of 1824 came into force, by which Texas joined Coahuila, forming the state of Coahuila and Texas, part of the United Mexican States. From 1823 to 1833 the capital and official seat of government was in Saltillo, Coahuila, while that from March 1833 until 1836, when Texas gained its independence from Mexico, the capital of the state was in Monclova, Coahuila.

Texas Revolution
During the Texas Revolution, the Consultation declared independence from Mexico.  An interim government was formed pending elections. The capital of the American colony of Texas was established in San Felipe de Austin.

Republic of Texas

State of Texas
See: List of governors of Texas

Notes

References

 Texas State Library & Archives Commission Web Site

Governors and presidents
Texas